Piccolo is a 1977 release by the Ron Carter Quartet. The quartet consists of Ron Carter on piccolo bass, Kenny Barron on piano, Buster Williams on double bass, and Ben Riley on drums. The album was recorded live at Sweet Basil in New York City on March 25–26, 1977. Piccolo is considered one of Ron Carter's best albums from the late 1970s due to its excellent recording, live-club feel, and exquisite musicianship.  After being brought together by Carter and playing in his quartet for a few years, Barron, Williams, and Riley went on to form Sphere with Charlie Rouse.

Reception
The Allmusic review by Scott Yanow stated "This double album is mostly recommended to lovers of bass solos [...] These performances, which are well-played, are almost all quite long, so listeners who prefer more variety in their music are advised to look elsewhere."

Track listing
All compositions by Ron Carter except as indicated
 "Saguaro" – 18:25
 "Sunshower" (Kenny Barron) – 15:17
 "Three Little Words" (Harry Ruby, Bert Kalmar) – 8:46
 "Laverne Walk" (Oscar Pettiford) – 12:24
 "Little Waltz" – 8:15
 "Tambien Conocido Como" – 12:59

Note : The original double LP vinyl issue also included the track "Blue Monk" – 6:13 as track 3. This was omitted from CD issues due to time constraints, but does appear on the Milestone label's compilation of 70's Carter material entitled Standard Bearers.

Personnel
Ron Carter – piccolo bass
Kenny Barron – piano
Buster Williams – bass
Ben Riley – drums

References

1977 live albums
Ron Carter albums
Milestone Records live albums
Albums produced by Orrin Keepnews